The Centuriate Assembly (Latin: comitia centuriata) of the Roman Republic was one of the three voting assemblies in the Roman constitution. It was named the Centuriate Assembly as it originally divided Roman citizens into groups of one hundred men by classes. The centuries initially reflected military status, but were later based on the wealth of their members. The centuries gathered into the Centuriate Assembly for legislative, electoral, and judicial purposes. The majority of votes in any century decided how that century voted. Each century received one vote, regardless of how many electors each Century held. Once a majority of centuries voted in the same way on a given measure, the voting ended, and the matter was decided. Only the Centuriate Assembly could declare war or elect the highest-ranking Roman magistrates: consuls, praetors and censors. The Centuriate Assembly could also pass a law that granted constitutional command authority, or "Imperium", to Consuls and Praetors (the lex de imperio or "Law on Imperium"), and Censorial powers to Censors (the lex de potestate censoria or "Law on Censorial Powers"). In addition, the Centuriate Assembly served as the highest court of appeal in certain judicial cases (in particular, cases involving perduellio), and ratified the results of a Census.

Since the Romans used a form of direct democracy, citizens, and not elected representatives, voted before each assembly. As such, the citizen-electors had no power, other than the power to cast a vote. Each assembly was presided over by a single Roman Magistrate, and as such, it was the presiding magistrate who made all decisions on matters of procedure and legality. Ultimately, the presiding magistrate's power over the assembly was nearly absolute. The only check on that power came in the form of vetoes handed down by other magistrates. Any decision made by a presiding magistrate could be vetoed by a tribune of the plebs, or by a higher-ranked magistrate (for example, a consul could veto a praetor).

Assembly procedure
In the Roman system of direct democracy, two primary types of assembly were used to vote on legislative, electoral, and judicial matters. The first was the committee (comitia, literally "going together" or "meeting place"). The Centuriate Assembly was a Committee. Committees were assemblies of all citizens, and were used for official purposes, such as for the enactment of laws. Acts of a Committee applied to all of the members of that Committee. The second type of assembly was the council (concilium), which was a forum where specific groups of citizens met for official purposes. In contrast, the Convention (conventio, literally "coming together") was an unofficial forum for communication. Conventions were simply forums where Romans met for specific unofficial purposes, such as, for example, to hear a political speech. Private citizens who did not hold political office could only speak before a Convention, and not before a Committee or a Council. Conventions were simply meetings, and no legal or legislative decisions could be made in one. Voters always assembled first into Conventions to hear debates and conduct other business before voting, and then into Committees or Councils to actually vote.

A notice always had to be given several days before the assembly was to actually vote. For elections, at least three market-days (often more than seventeen actual days) had to pass between the announcement of the election, and the actual election. During this time period (the trinundinum), the candidates interacted with the electorate, and no legislation could be proposed or voted upon. In 98 BC, a law was passed (the lex Caecilia Didia) which required a similar three market-day interval to pass between the proposal of a law and the vote on that law. During criminal trials, the assembly's presiding magistrate had to give a notice (diem dicere) to the accused person on the first day of the investigation (anquisito). At the end of each day, the magistrate had to give another notice to the accused person (diem prodicere), which informed him of the status of the investigation. After the investigation was complete, a three market-day interval had to elapse before a final vote could be taken with respect to conviction or acquittal.

Only one assembly could operate at any given point in time, and any session already underway could be dissolved if a magistrate "called away" (avocare) the electors. In addition to the presiding magistrate, several additional magistrates were often present to act as assistants. They were available to help resolve procedural disputes, and to provide a mechanism through which electors could appeal decisions of the presiding magistrate. There were also religious officials (known as Augurs) either in attendance or on-call, who would be available to help interpret any signs from the Gods (omens), since the Romans believed that their gods let their approval or disapproval with proposed actions be known. In addition, a preliminary search for omens (auspices) was conducted by the presiding magistrate the night before any meeting. On several known occasions, presiding magistrates used the claim of unfavorable omens as an excuse to suspend a session that was not going the way they wanted.  In 162, the presiding magistrate, Tiberius Sempronius Gracchus, even cancelled the elections of the consuls Publius Cornelius Scipio Nasica Corculum and Gaius Marcius Figulus because he found he had not conducted the auspices correctly; the consuls were forced to resign and new elections were organised.

On the day of the vote, the electors first assembled into their Conventions for debate and campaigning. In the Conventions, the electors were not sorted into their respective centuries. Speeches from private citizens were only heard if the issue to be voted upon was a legislative or judicial matter, and even then, only if the citizen received permission from the presiding magistrate. If the purpose of the ultimate vote was for an election, no speeches from private citizens were heard, and instead, the candidates for office used the convention to campaign. During the convention, the bill to be voted upon was read to the assembly by an officer known as a "Herald". A tribune of the plebs could use his veto against pending legislation up until this point, but not after.

The electors were then told to break up the convention ("depart to your separate groups", or discedite, quirites), and assemble into their formal century. The electors assembled behind a fenced off area and voted by placing a pebble or written ballot into an appropriate jar. The baskets (cistae) that held the votes were watched by specific officers (the custodes), who then counted the ballots, and reported the results to the presiding magistrate. The majority of votes in any century decided how that century voted. If the process was not complete by nightfall, the electors were dismissed without having reached a decision, and the process had to begin again the next day.

Presiding magistrate and elections

The presiding magistrate sat on a special chair (the "curule chair"), wore a purple-bordered toga, and was accompanied by bodyguards called lictors. Each lictor carried the symbol of state power, the fasces, which was a bundle of white birch rods, tied together with a red leather ribbon into a cylinder, and with a blade on the side, projecting from the bundle. While the voters in this assembly wore white undecorated togas and were unarmed, they were still soldiers, and as such they could not meet inside of the physical boundary of the city of Rome (the pomerium). Because of this, as well as the large size of the assembly (as many as 373 centuries), the assembly often met on the Field of Mars (Latin: Campus Martius), which was a large field located right outside of the city wall. The president of the Centuriate Assembly was usually a Consul (although sometimes a Praetor). Only Consuls (the highest-ranking of all Roman Magistrates) could preside over the Centuriate Assembly during elections because the higher-ranking Consuls were always elected together with the lower-ranking Praetors. Consuls and Praetors were usually elected in July, and took office in January. Two Consuls, and at least six Praetors, were elected each year for an annual term that began in January and ended in December. In contrast, two Censors were elected every five years on average. Once every five years, after the new Consuls for the year took office, they presided over the Centuriate Assembly as it elected the two Censors.

Servian organization (509-241 BC)

The Centuriate Assembly was supposedly founded by the legendary Roman King Servius Tullius, less than a century before the founding of the Roman Republic in 509 BC. As such, the original design of the Centuriate Assembly was known as the "Servian organization". Under this organization, the assembly was supposedly designed to mirror the Roman army during the time of the Roman Kingdom, with a division such that the citizen-soldiers had the responsibility of electing the consuls and praetors, and therefore, their leaders. The Roman army was based on units called centuries, which were comparable to Companies in a modern army. While Centuries in the Roman army always consisted of about one hundred soldiers, Centuries in the Centuriate Assembly usually did not. This was because the property qualifications for membership in a voting century did not change over time, as property qualifications for membership in a military century did.

Soldiers in the Roman army were classified on the basis of the amount of property that they owned, and as such, soldiers with more property outranked soldiers with less property. Since the wealthy soldiers were divided into more centuries in the early Roman army, with a greater military burden, the wealthy soldiers were also divided into more centuries in the Centuriate Assembly. Thus, the wealthy soldiers, who were fewer in number and had more to lose, had a greater overall influence.

The 193 centuries in the assembly under the Servian Organization were each divided into one of three different grades: the officer class (the cavalry or equites), the enlisted class (infantry or pedites) and the miscellaneous class (mostly unarmed adjuncts). The officer class was grouped into eighteen centuries, six of which (the sex suffragia) were composed exclusively of Patricians. The enlisted class was grouped into 170 centuries. Most enlisted individuals (those aged seventeen to forty-six) were grouped into eighty-five centuries of "junior soldiers" (iuniores or "young men"). The relatively limited number of enlisted soldiers who were aged forty-six to sixty were grouped into eighty-five centuries of "senior soldiers" (seniores or "old men"). The result of this arrangement was that the votes of the older soldiers carried more weight than did the votes of the numerically greater younger soldiers. According to Cicero, the Consul of 63 BC, this design was intentional so that the decisions of the assembly were more in line with the will of the more experienced soldiers who arguably had more to lose. The 170 centuries of enlisted soldiers were divided into five classes, each with a separate property requirement: The first class consisted of soldiers with heavy armor, the lower classes had successively less armor, and the soldiers of the fifth class had nothing more than slings and stones. Each of the five property classes were divided equally between centuries of younger soldiers and centuries of older soldiers. The first class of enlisted soldiers consisted of eighty centuries, classes two through four consisted of twenty centuries each, and class five consisted of thirty centuries. The unarmed soldiers were divided into the final five centuries: four of these centuries were composed of artisans and musicians (such as trumpeters and horn blowers), while the fifth century (the proletarii) consisted of people with little or no property.
 
During a vote, all of the centuries of one class had to vote before the centuries of the next lower class could vote. The seven classes voted in a specific order: The first enlisted class voted first, followed by the officer class (with the six patrician equestrian centuries voting first among them), then the second enlisted class, then the third enlisted class, then the fourth enlisted class, then the fifth enlisted class, and then finally the unarmed centuries. When a measure received a simple majority of the vote, the voting ended, and as such, many lower ranking centuries rarely if ever had a chance to actually vote.

Reorganization (241 BC- 27 BC)
Under the Servian Organization, the assembly was so aristocratic that the officer class and the first class of enlisted soldiers controlled enough centuries for an outright majority. In 241 BC, this assembly was reorganized by the Censors Marcus Fabius Buteo and Gaius Aurelius Cotta, in order to give more weight to the lower ranking centuries, and thus make the assembly less aristocratic. Under the old system, there were a total of 193 centuries, while under the new system, there were a total of 373 centuries. Under the new system, the thirty-five Tribes were each divided into ten centuries: five of older soldiers, and five of younger soldiers. Of each of these five centuries, one was assigned to one of the five property classes. Therefore, each Tribe had two centuries (one of older soldiers and one of younger soldiers) allocated to each of the five property classes. In addition, the property requirements for each of the five classes were probably raised. In total, this resulted in 350 centuries of enlisted soldiers. The same eighteen centuries of officers, and the same five centuries of unarmed soldiers, were also included in the redesign. Now, majorities usually could not be reached until the third class of enlisted centuries had begun voting.

Since the lowest ranking century in the Centuriate Assembly, the fifth unarmed century (the proletarii), was always the last century to vote, it never had any real influence on elections, and as such, it was so poorly regarded that it was all but ignored during the Census. In 107 BC, in response to high unemployment and a severe manpower shortage in the army, the general and Consul Gaius Marius reformed the organization of the army, and allowed individuals with no property to enlist. As a consequence of these reforms, this fifth unarmed century came to encompass almost the entire Roman army. This mass disenfranchisement of most of the soldiers in the army played an important role in the chaos that led to the fall of the Roman Republic in 27 BC.

During his dictatorship from 82 BC until 80 BC, Lucius Cornelius Sulla restored the old Servian organization to this assembly. This reform was one in a slate of constitutional reforms enacted by Sulla as a consequence of the recent Civil War between his supporters and those of the former Consul Gaius Marius. His reforms were intended to reassert aristocratic control over the constitution, and thus prevent the emergence of another Marius. Sulla died in 78 BC, and in 70 BC, the Consuls Pompey Magnus and Marcus Licinius Crassus repealed Sulla's constitutional reforms, including his restoration of the Servian organization to this assembly. They restored the less aristocratic organization (from 241 BC by the Censors Marcus Fabius Buteo and Gaius Aurelius Cotta).

See also

 Roman Kingdom
 Roman Republic
 Roman Empire
 Roman Law
 Plebeian Council
 Centuria
 Curia
 Roman consul
 Praetor
 Roman censor
 Quaestor
 Aedile
 Roman Dictator
 Master of the Horse
 Roman Senate
 Cursus honorum
 Byzantine Senate
 Pontifex Maximus
 Princeps senatus
 Interrex
 Promagistrate
 Acta Senatus

References

 Abbott, Frank Frost (1901). A History and Description of Roman Political Institutions. Elibron Classics.
 Byrd, Robert (1995). The Senate of the Roman Republic. U.S. Government Printing Office, Senate Document 103-23.
 Cicero, Marcus Tullius (1841). The Political Works of Marcus Tullius Cicero: Comprising his Treatise on the Commonwealth; and his Treatise on the Laws. Translated from the original, with Dissertations and Notes in Two Volumes. By Francis Barham, Esq. London: Edmund Spettigue. Vol. 1.
 Lintott, Andrew (1999). The Constitution of the Roman Republic. Oxford University Press.
 Polybius (1823). The General History of Polybius: Translated from the Greek. By James Hampton. Oxford: Printed by W. Baxter. Fifth Edition, Vol 2.
 Taylor, Lily Ross (1966). Roman Voting Assemblies: From the Hannibalic War to the Dictatorship of Caesar. The University of Michigan Press.

Notes

Further reading

 Ihne, Wilhelm. Researches Into the History of the Roman Constitution. William Pickering. 1853.
 Johnston, Harold Whetstone. Orations and Letters of Cicero: With Historical Introduction, An Outline of the Roman Constitution, Notes, Vocabulary and Index. Scott, Foresman and Company. 1891.
 Mommsen, Theodor. Roman Constitutional Law. 1871-1888
 Tighe, Ambrose. The Development of the Roman Constitution. D. Apple & Co. 1886.
 Von Fritz, Kurt. The Theory of the Mixed Constitution in Antiquity. Columbia University Press, New York. 1975.
 The Histories by Polybius
 Cambridge Ancient History, Volumes 9–13.
 A. Cameron, The Later Roman Empire, (Fontana Press, 1993).
 M. Crawford, The Roman Republic, (Fontana Press, 1978).
 E. S. Gruen, "The Last Generation of the Roman Republic" (U California Press, 1974)
 F. Millar, The Emperor in the Roman World, (Duckworth, 1977, 1992).
 A. Lintott, "The Constitution of the Roman Republic" (Oxford University Press, 1999)
 T. Robert S. Broughton, The Magistrates of the Roman Republic, American Philological Association, 1952–1960.

Primary sources
 Cicero's De Re Publica, Book Two
 Rome at the End of the Punic Wars: An Analysis of the Roman Government; by Polybius

Secondary source material
 Considerations on the Causes of the Greatness of the Romans and their Decline, by Montesquieu 
 The Roman Constitution to the Time of Cicero
 What a Terrorist Incident in Ancient Rome Can Teach Us

Government of the Kingdom of Rome
Government of the Roman Republic
Popular assemblies